MTRR may refer to:

 5-methyltetrahydrofolate-homocysteine methyltransferase reductase, a human gene
 Memory Type Range Registers, in computer hardware